Lambaran (also Romanized as Lambarān and Lombarān; also known as Lambara, Lanbarān, Lombareh, and Lonbarān) is a village in Sina Rural District, in the Central District of Varzaqan County, East Azerbaijan Province, Iran. At the 2006 census, its population was 289, in 81 families.<ref></ref

References 

Towns and villages in Varzaqan County